This page details Northern Ireland national football team records and statistics; the most capped players, the players with the most goals, and Northern Ireland's match record by opponent and decade.

Player records

Most capped players
 after the match against .

Players with an equal number of caps are ranked in chronological order of reaching the milestone.

Top goalscorers 
 after the match against .

Players with an equal number of goals are ranked in chronological order of reaching the milestone.

Most captaincies 

 after the match against .

Captaincy appearances are only awarded to players who were assigned the captaincy at the start of an international game.Players with an equal number of captaincies are ranked in chronological order of reaching the milestone.

Most clean sheets 

 after the match against .

A goalkeeper is awarded a clean sheet if he does not concede a goal during his time on the pitch.

Hat-tricks 
The result is presented with Northern Ireland's score first.

Red cards 
The result is presented with Northern Ireland's score first.

Individual and Team records

Age records
 Youngest player to make debut: Samuel Johnston – 15 years and 154 days, 18 February 1882 vs 
 Oldest player to play a game: Elisha Scott – 42 years and 200 days, 11 March 1936 vs 
 Youngest player to play at World Cup finals: Norman Whiteside – 17 years and 41 days, 17 June 1982 vs 
 Oldest player to play at World Cup finals: Pat Jennings – 41 years and 0 days, 12 June 1986 vs  
 Youngest player to score a goal: Samuel Johnston – 15 years and 161 days, 25 February 1882 vs

Goal records
 First Irish goal: Samuel Johnston – 15 years and 161 days, 25 February 1882 vs 
 Most goals scored in one game by a player: 6 – Joe Bambrick, 1 February 1930 vs

Firsts
 First International: 18 February 1882 vs 
 First home international: 18 February 1882 vs 
 First win: 12 March 1887 vs 
 First overseas opponent: , 25 May 1922
 First win over an overseas opponent: 1 May 1957 vs

Streaks
 Most consecutive victories: 5
 26 March 2017 – 4 September 2017
 21 March 2019 – 5 September 2019
 Most consecutive matches without defeat: 12
 29 March 2015 – 4 June 2016
 Most consecutive draws: 4
 11 September 2012 – 6 February 2013
 Most consecutive matches without a draw: 24
 26 January 1884 – 28 March 1891
 Most consecutive matches without victory: 21
 5 November 1947 – 7 November 1953
 Most consecutive defeats: 11
 26 January 1884 – 19 February 1887
 3 October 1959 – 7 October 1961
 Most consecutive matches scoring: 13
 4 November 1933 – 16 March 1938
 Most consecutive matches without scoring: 13
 27 March 2002 – 11 October 2003
 Most consecutive matches conceding a goal: 46
 18 February 1882 – 27 March 1897
 Most consecutive matches without conceding a goal: 6
 27 March 1985 – 26 February 1986

Biggest wins

Heaviest defeats

Competition Records

FIFA World Cup
Qualification
First match: 1 October 1949 vs 
First goal: Sammy Smyth vs , 1 October 1949

Finals
 First finals: Sweden 1958
 Total number of times qualified for the finals: 3 (1958), (1982) and (1986)
 First game: 8 June 1958 vs 
 First goal: Wilbur Cush vs , 8 June 1958
 Most Successful final: 1958 – Quarter finals
 World Cup top goal scorer: 5
 Peter McParland (1958)

UEFA European Championship
Qualification
First match: 10 October 1962 vs 
First goal: Derek Dougan vs , 10 October 1962

Finals
 First finals: France 2016
 Total number of times qualified for the finals: 1 (2016)
 First game: 12 June 2016 vs 
 First goal: Gareth McAuley vs , 16 June 2016
 Most Successful final: 2016 - Round of 16
 European Championship scorer: 1
 Gareth McAuley (2016)
 Niall McGinn (2016)

UEFA Nations League
Qualification
First match: 8 September 2018 vs 
First goal: Will Grigg vs , 8 September 2018

Rankings
 Highest FIFA Rank: 20 (September 2017)
 Lowest FIFA Rank: 129 (September 2012)
 Highest Elo Rank: 5 (1882)
 Lowest Elo Rank: 114 (11 October 2013)

Performance

Performance by competition

 after the match against .

Statistics include official FIFA recognised matches only

Performance by manager

 after the match against .

Statistics include official FIFA recognised matches only

Performance by venue

 after the match against .

Performance by confederation

 after the match against .

Statistics include official FIFA recognised matches only

Performance by decade

 after the match against .

Statistics include official FIFA recognised matches only

All-time records

Head to head records

 after the match against .

Statistics include official FIFA recognised matches only

FIFA members yet to play against Northern Ireland
 after the match against .

Competitive record
 Champions  Runners-up  Third Place  Fourth Place

FIFA World Cup

UEFA European Championship

UEFA Nations League

British Home Championship

Minor tournaments

Honours

Titles 
British Home Championship
 **Winners (3): 1914 (as ), 1980, 1984
 **Shared (5): 1903, 1956, 1958, 1959, 1964

FIFA Rankings
Last updated 12 June 2022

Notes

References

External links 

 Irish Football Association – Northern Ireland Football official site
 Northern Ireland Stats & Statistics
 RSSSF archive of international results 1882–
 RSSSF archive of most capped players and highest goalscorers

records and statistics
National association football team records and statistics